The Norwegian America Line, was a shipping line, originally an operator of ocean liners and cargo ships. Founded in 1910, the company ran a regular transatlantic service between Norway and the United States, and later included a route to East Africa as well. Primarily due to competition from air travel, transatlantic passenger voyages were slowly discontinued during the years.

After the Great War, the company was one of Norway’s largest shipping lines, owning a fleet that included 19 vessels, several of which were for commercial cargo transport.
After the Second World War heavy ships losses were overcome by the building of new vessels, however the reduction in the passengers’ traffic by sea shifted the company’s focus mainly to the cargo business, including container and bulk shipping from the 1970s.

In 1980 the last two passenger liners were handed over into a new joint venture company (Norwegian American Cruises) with Leif Höegh & Co,
and finally sold to Cunard Line in 1984.

During the 1990s NAL main business were the Roll-on/roll-off operations and sea carriage of cars, through the NOSAC brand (Norwegian Specialised Autocarcarriers), with a fleet of nearly 20 vessels, then acquired by Wilh. Wilhelmsen in 1995.

Ships
List sourced from

Passenger ships

Other ships

Managing directors
1911–39 Gustav Henriksen
1939–48 Andreas Johnsen
1948–73 Hans Christian Henriksen

Chairmen of the Board
 1929–39 Sigval Bergesen
 1940–48 Thor Thoresen
 1948–?? Leif Høegh

Boutique hotel

The former headquarters of the shipping company (1919 – 1983) with ticket office and administration is still an iconic building in central Oslo. It was rebuilt inside and opened in March 2019 as a boutique hotel. The hotel took the name Amerikalinjen.

See also
 Hamburg America Line
 Holland America Line
 Scandinavian America Line
 Swedish American Line

References

External links 

 The Ships List: Norwegian America Line
 Simplon Postcards: Norwegian America Line
 Norway Heritage — "Hands across the sea"
 Passenger Lists from Den Norske Amerikalinje (Norwegian America Line) GG Archives
 Norwegian America Line (NAL) History and Ephemera GG Archives

 
Defunct cruise lines
Defunct shipping companies of Norway
Transatlantic shipping companies
Transport companies established in 1910
Transport companies disestablished in 1995
1995 disestablishments in Norway
Norwegian companies established in 1910